Achilles Liarmakopoulos (born 29 August 1985) is a Greek trombonist. He has been a member of the Canadian Brass since 2011.

Early life and education
Born in Athens, Greece, Liarmakopoulos started trombone lessons at the Philippos Nakas Conservatory, graduating with Excellent Unanimous and first prize. At the age of 18, Liarmakopoulos performed as a soloist at the Walt Disney Hall as the Grand Prize Winner of the Pasadena Showcase House Instrumental Competition, judged by members of the Los Angeles Philharmonic.

Liarmakopoulos holds degrees from the Yale School of Music, the Curtis Institute of Music (class of 2008), the San Francisco Conservatory of Music, and the Philippos Nakas Conservatory in his hometown of Athens, Greece. His studies have been supported by merit-based scholarships, Bok Foundation and Milton L. Rock Annual Fellowships and scholarships from the Henry and Lucy Moses Fund, Alexandros S. Onassis Foundation, and the Greek State Scholarship Foundation. Yale University awarded him the Philip Francis Nelson Prize for outstanding musicianship.

Career
In December 2010, Liarmakopoulos won the position of principal trombone of the Greek Radio Symphony Orchestra, where he played for one season before joining the Canadian Brass. He has also performed with the Malaysian Philharmonic, Jacksonville Symphony, and European Union Youth Orchestra.

In April 2011, he was invited to audition for the Canadian Brass, and since then, he has been their trombonist, touring with the group all over the world.

Liarmakopoulos has received awards in the Yamaha Music Foundation of Europe and the 2nd Christian Lindberg International Trombone competition.

His debut solo album, Ástor Piazzolla: Tango Distinto was released by Naxos Records in 2011. It is the first full album to feature Astor Piazzolla's music on solo trombone.

In 2013, Liarmakopoulos released his second solo album titled Discoveries  with new works for trombone and piano, collaborating with piano soloist Amy J. Yang.

In January 2013, Liarmakopoulos was invited to play with the Oregon-based genre-bending ensemble Pink Martini. Since then, he has performed with them regularly all over the world.

Liarmakopoulos' third album Trombone Atrevido with choro music from Brazil was released in July 2015 on the ODEG label. The album was produced by guitarist Spiros Exaras and mastered by Bernie Grundman at the Bernie Grundman Mastering Studios-Los Angeles, CA.

In 2017, he released his fourth solo album titled Ethereal. The album features six brand new compositions and five arrangements with an exceptional roster of musicians from all over the world, including Fernando Suarez Paz from Astor Piazzolla's legendary Tango Quintet.

Liarmakopoulos is an adjunct trombone professor at Brooklyn College in New York City.

In 2018, he formed Cuatrombon with Jorge Glem on cuatro, Manuel Rangel on maracas, and Bam Bam Rodriguez on bass. Together they released three singles of Venezuelan music and, in 2020, an album entitled "Volar."

Premieres
Liarmakopoulos is a supporter of new music and new works for trombone, and has premiered a number of pieces by new composers. Four Trombone concertos and several chamber pieces have been written specifically for him . He premiered Dream (for trombone solo, string orchestra and harp) by Andrew Cadima at the Curtis Institute of Music in May 2008.

Dedicated works 
 Anaklasis - Vagelis Simsiris (1998)
Concerto for Trombone - John Ellis
 Dream - Concerto for Trombone and Strings - Andrew Cadima (2008)
Opening of the 2nd Gate - Concerto for Trombone - Joowan Kim (2008)
 Indigo for Trombone and Piano - John Ellis (2009)
 Tango Paradiso for Trombone and piano - John Ellis (2009)
The bounds of Spring - Taylor Roland (2010)Spiros Exaras
Ypopsia - Andrew Cadima (2010)
 Chinese suite - Hua Yang (2010)
 Krakatoa for Trombone and Marimba - Stephen Feigenbaum (2010)
 Concertino for Trombone and Strings - Dinos Costantinides (2012)
 Chorinho do sol - Spiros Exaras (2014)
 Distance for Trombone and Trombone Choir - Andrew Cadima (2015)
 Sleepwalker for Trombone and harp - Andrew Cadima (2016)
 Trombonsillo for Trombone and piano - Carolina Calvache (2016)
 Oscuro Silencio - Gabriel Senanes (2017)
 Nostos for trombone and harp - Spiros Exaras (2017)
Tango y Milonga - Pablo Estigarribia (2018) 
In memoriam Theodore Antoniou for trombone and harp - Michalis Andronikou (2019)
Endlessness for solo trombone -  Brandon Ridenour (2019)
The Dwarf Planets - Spiros Exaras (2020)
Dance of Tears - Spiros Exaras (2021)
Life in the City - Spiros Exaras (2022)

Competitions and awards
Second Christian Lindberg International Solo Competition: Second Prize
International Trombone Festival Robert Marsteller/Conn-Selmer Competition: Winner
International Trombone Festival Solo Competition: Winner
International Trombone Festival Larry Wiehe Competition: Winner
San Francisco Conservatory of Music Concerto Competition: Winner
Pasadena Showcase House Instrumental Competition: Grand-prize winner
2010 Yale School of Music Woolsey Hall Concerto Competition: Honorable Mention

Discography

Solo
 Tango Distinto – Astor Piazzolla (2011, Naxos Records)
 Discoveries – New works for trombone and piano (2014, ODEG)
 Trombone Atrevido - Choro music from Brazil (2015, ODEG)
 Ethereal - (2017, AL)
 Obvious -  with harpist Coline-Marie Orliac - (2018, AL)
Volar - with Cuatrombón - (2020, AL)

EPs 

 Chorinho a Tres - with Samuel Adams & Ian O'Sullivan (2009)
 Tango y Milonga - with Pablo Estigarribia (2019) 
 Apasionado - with Jaime Henao (2022)

Singles 

 Distance - with The University of Oklahoma Trombone Choir under the direction of Irvin Wagner - Andrew Cadima  - 2020
 Transitions - with Andreas Rolandos Theodorou - composed by Carolina Calvache (2020)
 Milonga en Re - Astor Piazzolla  (2011)
 Color Perfume - Fervorchestra conducted by Gabriel Senanes   (2019)
 Teu Aniversario - Pixinguinha   (2019)
 Ahora - with Manuel Rangel  (2019)
 Chorando em Sao Paolo - with Vitor Goncalvez & Sergio Krakowksi 
 Transitions - with Andreas Rolandos Theodorou - composed by Carolina Calvache (2020)
 I will never forget - composed and performed along Spiros Exaras (2019)
 Christmas Fantasy - Spiros Exaras (2020)
 In Memoriam Theodore Antoniou (2021)
 La Flambée Montalbanaise - with Cordeone (2021)
 Red Moon of Love - Dimitris Gouzios - with Kostas Avgerinos (2022) 
 Elegie - Max Peters - with Krista Malerba (2022) 
 A Nuvem Triste - Alexandros Livitsanos - with Kahlo Quartet

With the Canadian Brass 
 Canadian Brass Takes Flight (2011)
 Brass Romance (2012, single)
 Carnaval (Robert Schumann's Kinderszenen and Carnaval) (2013)
 Christmas Time is Here (2013)
 Great Wall of China (2014)
 Perfect Landing (2015)
Volks Lieder - Canadian Brass with the Hannover Boy Choir (2019)

Notes

Footnotes

External links
 Liarmakopoulos in the Canadian Brass
 Spanish-language review of Ástor Piazzolla: Tango Distinto

1985 births
Living people
21st-century Greek musicians
21st-century trombonists
Musicians from Athens
Yale School of Music alumni
Curtis Institute of Music alumni
San Francisco Conservatory of Music alumni
Brooklyn College faculty